The Swedish Dental Association is the main odontological organization in Sweden. It deals with issues affecting the role of dentists, professional ethics, education and science.

The Swedish Dental Association was established in 1908 and has currently some 9,500 members, of whom some 4,000 practice in the public dental service and 3,500 are private practitioners. In addition, some 250 teachers at the four Swedish dental faculties are members of the association. The association publishes two journals, the Tandläkartidningen and the Swedish Dental Journal, the latter published in English 4 times annually to present Swedish odontological research.

See also
 Dentistry
 Swedish Dental Society

External links
 Sveriges Tandläkarförbund Official website

Dental organizations
Medical and health organizations based in Sweden
Organizations established in 1908
1908 establishments in Sweden